Université Internationale de Casablanca (International University of Casablanca) is a licensed private university in Casablanca, Morocco, which opened in September 2010.

External links 
 Université Internationale de Casablanca

Universities in Morocco
Education in Casablanca
Educational institutions established in 2010
2010 establishments in Morocco
21st-century architecture in Morocco